Suharno is a village in the municipality of Bujanovac, Serbia. According to the 2002 census, the town has a population of 309 people. Of these, 307 (99,35 %) were ethnic Albanians, 1 (0,32 %) Bosniak, and 1 (0,32 %) other.

References

Populated places in Pčinja District
Albanian communities in Serbia